The 1963 GP Ouest-France was the 27th edition of the GP Ouest-France cycle race and was held on 27 August 1963. The race started and finished in Plouay. The race was won by Fernand Picot.

General classification

References

1963
1963 in road cycling
1963 in French sport